Marcel Tomazover (27 February 1915 – 1 January 1989) was a French footballer player and coach. He played his professional career as a midfielder for Roubaix and Sète, in the 1930s and 1940s, before becoming a coach. Among others, he coached Montpellier, Nîmes and Red Star.

Honours 
 Champion of France Zone Sud in 1942 (with FC Sète)

References 
 Col., Football 72, Les Cahiers de l'Équipe, 1971, cf. notice de l'entraîneur, p. 83.

External links 
 

1915 births
1989 deaths
French footballers
Footballers from Paris
Association football defenders
RC Roubaix players
FC Sète 34 players
French football managers
FC Sète 34 managers
Montpellier HSC managers
FC Metz managers
Olympique Alès managers
AS Béziers Hérault (football) managers
Nîmes Olympique managers
Red Star F.C. managers